Rajiv Darjee (born 30 June 1991) is an Indian cricketer. He made his Twenty20 debut on 13 January 2021, for Sikkim in the 2020–21 Syed Mushtaq Ali Trophy. He made his List A debut on 21 February 2021, for Sikkim in the 2020–21 Vijay Hazare Trophy.

References

External links
 

1991 births
Living people
Indian cricketers
Sikkim cricketers
Place of birth missing (living people)